Timo Lampén (5 September 1934 – 27 May 1999) was a Finnish basketball player. He competed in the men's tournament at the 1964 Summer Olympics.

References

1934 births
1999 deaths
Finnish men's basketball players
Olympic basketball players of Finland
Basketball players at the 1964 Summer Olympics
Sportspeople from Lahti
20th-century Finnish people